Colin Pearson (14 September 1923 – 3 December 2007) was an English studio potter and art teacher.

Biography
Pearson was born in Friern Barnet, London in 1923 and studied at Goldsmiths College, University of London. He worked at Winchcombe Pottery under Ray Finch before going to Lambeth in 1954 to work at Royal Doulton.

In 1955 he took over as manager of Aylesford Pottery, Kent which David Leach had set up a year earlier. 
In 1961 he set up Quay Pottery making domestic ware in Aylesford.

He taught at Camberwell College of Arts and the Medway School of Art.

See also 
Studio pottery

References

External links 
Winchcombe Pottery
Obituary

1923 births
2007 deaths
English potters
20th-century ceramists